KXRD (96.7 FM) is a radio station licensed to serve Fayetteville, Arkansas, United States. The station is owned by John Lykins, through licensee Rox Radio Group, LLC.

Programming
KXRD broadcasts a Red Dirt country format. The station plays contemporary country with a focus on the most recent releases from Nashville.

On March 15, 2021, KCYT shifted from country to Red Dirt country, branded as "Red Dirt 96.7" under new KXRD call letters.

References

External links
KXRD official website

XRD
Country radio stations in the United States
Washington County, Arkansas
Radio stations established in 1981
1981 establishments in Arkansas